Sebkay (alternatively Sebekay or Sebekāi) was an ancient Egyptian pharaoh during the Second Intermediate Period. For a long time his position created problems and he was most often placed into the 13th Dynasty. However, the discovery of the tomb of a king with the name Senebkay make it very likely that Sebkay is identical with the latter and the writing of the name Sebkay is just a misspelling of the name.

Very little is known about him, since his name is attested only on a wooden birth Tusk (wand) found at Abydos and now in the Cairo Museum (CG 9433 / JE 34988).

Identity
Since the discovery of the wand, several Egyptologists have tried to identify this king with other rulers of the Second Intermediate Period. Stephen Quirke believed that “Sebkay” was a diminutive for “Sedjefakare”, which is the throne name of Kay-Amenemhat, while Jürgen von Beckerath considered the name a short form of the nomen “Sobekhotep” instead. Thomas Schneider supports von Beckerath's hypothesis, specifying that the king Sobekhotep likely was Sobekhotep II.

A more radical hypothesis came from Kim Ryholt, who suggested the reading “Seb's son Kay”, de facto splitting the name “Seb-kay” in two different pharaohs and thus filling a gap in the Turin King List before Kay-Amenemhat. Furthermore, in this reconstruction the name of the last mentioned king should be considered a patronymic too, and must be read “Kay's son Amenemhat”, thus setting a dynastic line consisting of three kings: Seb, his son Kay, and the latter's son Amenemhat. Ryholt's interpretation is considered daring and controversial by some egyptologists.

In 2014, at Abydos, a team of archaeologists discovered the tomb of a previously unknown king of the Second Intermediate Period, called Senebkay. It has been suggested that this ruler and Sebkay might be the same person.

References

17th-century BC Pharaohs
Pharaohs of the Thirteenth Dynasty of Egypt
2nd-millennium BC births
2nd-millennium BC deaths
Pharaohs of the Abydos Dynasty